Curran is a small village and townland in County Londonderry, Northern Ireland. In the 2001 Census it had a population of 132 people. It is within the Mid-Ulster District Council area, specifically within the Moyola District Electoral Area.  The village is in the Mid-Ulster constituency for Westminster and Northern Ireland Assembly elections.

Once a thriving market village, Curran has been superseded in recent years by other surrounding towns and villages.  The shop, post office and primary school have all closed, the latter being amalgamated with the new primary school in nearby Knockloughrim in 1979.  Curran Presbyterian Church is a joint charge with Castledawson Presbyterian Church. The main A6 Belfast-Derry road runs nearby.  The majority of local Anglicans worship at Termoneeny Parish Church in Knockloughrim.

The village is also home to the oldest continuously working Masonic lodge in the Province of Londonderry and Donegal. Formed in 1776 the lodge still meets in the Freemason's Hall in the centre of the village.

References 

Villages in County Londonderry
Mid-Ulster District